The 1935–1936 protests in Egypt was a nationwide revolution and mass uprising against British influence in Egypt and student demonstrations demanding independence after plans by the Egyptian government to annex all of Egypt and the signing of a peace treaty and the 1923 constitution became inapplicable. Massive demonstrations and pro-Democratic riots first waged on as a wave of national protests and civil disobedience against the provincial government and British influence in the country. Pro-war university strikes and anti-British protests in November 1935 was met with force by the Egyptian government, including live ammunition and rubber bullets. Anti-British and anti-government democratic opposition remonstrances continued and escalated into riots and snowballed into a full-scale revolution, with fighting between demonstrators and the military. Mass protests spread nationwide in January–February, despite a violent crackdown. Large-scale Strike actions was deplored across Egypt, like Helwan, Hurghada and Port Said. The protests was the first national uprising since the Egyptian Revolution of 1919 and the most violent and popular since. 100+ protesters were killed in the clashes and intense crackdown and the fighting among crowds and the military while attempts to quell the mass uprising.

See also
 Egyptian Revolution of 1919
 2011 Egyptian Revolution

References

1935 in Egypt
1936 in Egypt
Protests in Egypt